Alcohol is any organic compound in which a hydroxyl functional group (-OH) is bound to a carbon atom, usually connected to other carbon or hydrogen atoms.  An important class are the simple acyclic alcohols, the general formula for which is CnH2n+1OH. Of those, ethanol (C2H5OH) is the type of alcohol found in alcoholic beverages, and in common speech the word alcohol refers specifically to ethanol. Articles related to alcohol include:

 Alcoholic beverage
 List of countries by alcohol consumption
 Alcohol abuse
 Alcohol advertising
 Impact of alcohol on aging
 Alcoholism
 Alcohol and breast cancer
 Alcohol and cancer
 Alcohol powder
 Alcohol and sex
 Alcohol dementia
 Alcohol inhalation
 Alcohol use and sleep
 Alcoholic spirits measures
 Anstie's limit
 Beer
 Beer snake
 Blackout (alcohol-related amnesia)
 Blood alcohol content
 Christian views on alcohol
 List of cocktails
 Long-term effects of alcohol
 Corporification
 Dipsomania
 Distilled beverage
 Drinking culture
 Drinking game
 Driving under the influence
 Drunkenness
 Alcohol education
 Alcohol equivalence
 Ethanol
 Ethyl glucuronide
 Ethylphenidate
 Alcohol flush reaction
 Get Your Sexy Back, moderate drinking campaign, Singapore
 Hangover
 Islam and alcohol
 Legal drinking age
 Liquor
 Patent medicine
 Positional alcohol nystagmus
 Potomania
 Recommended maximum intake of alcoholic beverages
 Roman eating and drinking
 Alcohol septal ablation
 Spins
 Alcohol tolerance
 Alcohol consumption by youth in the United States
 Under the Volcano
 Alcohol and weight
 Wine
 Wine and health

Alcohol